Breanna Clark (born November 4, 1994) is an American Paralympic athlete who has competed in T20 category races. She was diagnosed with autism at age four.

She has a twin brother named Rashard. Their mother, Rosalyn Clark, won a silver medal in the 1976 Summer Olympics in the women's 4 x 400 metres relay. Breanna is a world, Parapan American and Paralympic champion in the races that she competes in.

References

External links 
 
 
 

1994 births
Living people
Track and field athletes from Los Angeles
Paralympic track and field athletes of the United States
Medalists at the 2016 Summer Paralympics
Medalists at the 2020 Summer Paralympics
Athletes (track and field) at the 2016 Summer Paralympics
Athletes (track and field) at the 2020 Summer Paralympics
African-American female track and field athletes
Sportspeople with autism
Competitors in athletics with intellectual disability
Paralympic medalists in athletics (track and field)
Paralympic gold medalists for the United States
Medalists at the 2019 Parapan American Games
World Para Athletics Championships winners
American twins
Pasadena City College alumni
College women's track and field athletes in the United States
21st-century African-American sportspeople
21st-century African-American women